Frank Le Gall (born 23 September 1959 in Rouen), is a French author of comics. He was first published as a comic author at the age of 16 in Pistil. He then went on to work for Spirou, creating "Valry Bonpain," a comic series following a jazz musician, with Alain Clement.
He is best known for his own comic series Théodore Poussin.

Publications 
Une aventure de Spirou et Fantasio : Les marais du temps, (Dupuis, 2007)
Petits contes noirs - La Biologiste n'a pas de culotte (Dargaud, 2001)
Petits contes noirs - La Fin du Monde (Dargaud, 2000)
Les formidables aventures de Lapinot - Vacances de printemps, drawn by Lewis Trondheim, (Dargaud, 1999)
Théodore Poussin,  (Dupuis, from 1987 to 2005)
 Capitaine Steene, 1987
 Les mangeurs d'archipels, 1987
 Marie Vérité, 1988
 Secrets, 1990
 Le trésor du rajah blanc, 1991
 Un passager porté disparu, 1992
 La vallée des roses, 1993
 La maison dans l'île, 1994
 La terrasse des audiences, Tome 1, 1995
 La terrasse des audiences, Tome 2, 1997
 Novembre toute l'année, 2000
 Les jalousies, 2005
Les Barbutins (Delcourt, collection Jeunesse)
Catastrophes au pays du Père Noël (Delcourt, collection Jeunesse, 1996)

References

Living people
1959 births
French people of Breton descent